Fenimorea nivalis is a species of sea snail, a marine gastropod mollusc in the family Drilliidae.

Description
The length of this marine shell varies between 10 mm and 17 mm.

Distribution
This marine species occurs off Puerto Rico, Dominican Republic, the Bahamas and Brazil.

References

External links
  Fallon P.J. (2016). Taxonomic review of tropical western Atlantic shallow water Drilliidae (Mollusca: Gastropoda: Conoidea) including descriptions of 100 new species. Zootaxa. 4090(1): 1–363
 

nivalis
Gastropods described in 2016